Malays may refer to:

 Malays (ethnic group), an ethnic group on the Malay Peninsula and throughout Southeast Asia
 Bruneian Malays, Malays in Brunei
 Malaysian Malays, Malays in Malaysia
 Malay Indonesians, Malays in Indonesia
 Malay Singaporeans, Malays in Singapore
 Filipinos of Malay descent, Malays in the Philippines
 Thai Malays, Malays in Thailand
 Cocos Malays, Malays on Australia's Cocos Islands
 Overseas Malays, the Malay diaspora to other areas of the world
 Sri Lankan Malays, Malays in Sri Lanka
 Cape Malays, Malays in South Africa
 Malay race, a discredited pseudoscientific racial categorization

See also
 Malay (disambiguation)
 Malaya (disambiguation)
 Malaysian (disambiguation)